Chittagong Urea Fertilizer School and College is a pre-primary, primary, secondary, and higher secondary school in Rangadia, Anwara Upazila, Chittagong District, Bangladesh. Located inside the colony of Chittagong Urea Fertilizer Limited, it was established in 1988 to educate the children and dependents of company employees. It is operated by Bangladesh Chemical Industries Corporation. It has about 40 teachers and 900 students.

It prepares students for the Secondary School Certificate (SSC) and Higher Secondary (School) Certificate (HSC) examinations administered under the Board of Intermediate and Secondary Education, Chittagong.

References

1988 establishments in Bangladesh
educational institutions established in 1988
schools in Chittagong District